The Zuyev Workers' Club in Moscow is a prominent work of constructivist architecture.  It was designed by Ilya Golosov (1883–1945) in 1927 and finished in 1929. The building was designed to house various facilities for Moscow workers, and utilises an innovative glazing treatment at its corner which has proved very photogenic.

Golosov was an enthusiast for expressive, dynamic form rather than the logics of Constructivist design methods. The building facade consists of cylindrical glazed staircases intersecting with stacked rectangular floor planes to create a dramatic composition. A sequence of club rooms and open foyers lead to an 850-seat auditorium.

Since Golosov's time some of the fenestration has been bricked over, reducing the original perforated cubic mass into a more solid box.

References

External links

Profile at galinsky.com

Buildings and structures in Moscow
Clubhouses
Buildings and structures built in the Soviet Union
Buildings and structures completed in 1928
Constructivist architecture
Modernist architecture in Russia
Cultural heritage monuments of regional significance in Moscow